Four Fast Guns is a 1960 American Western film directed by William J. Hole Jr. and written by James Edmiston and Dallas Gaultois. The film stars James Craig, Martha Vickers, Edgar Buchanan, Brett Halsey, Paul Richards and Richard Martin. The film was released on February 10, 1960, by Universal Pictures.

Plot
Wanted outlaw Tom Sabin rides to the town of Purgatory, ruled by a ruthless man named Hoag, who is deemed safe from being killed by virtue of being handicapped and in a wheelchair.

Tom befriends town deputy Dipper and attracts the interest of Hoag's beautiful wife Mary, although he isn't sure whether to trust her. Hoag sends for three hired gunman to get Tom out of his town, but Tom gets the better of the first two, shooting both.

The third, Johnny Naco, is offered triple pay by Hoag to get the job done. All in town are shocked when Tom refuses to face Johnny. It turns out they are brothers. Tom took the blame for a crime Johnny committed, so a grateful Johnny doesn't want to kill him.

Johnny does shoot Hoag, who tries to kill Tom himself with a shotgun. But when townspeople ridicule Tom for not facing the outlaw, Johnny calls him out and draws, forcing Tom to shoot him. Tom leaves the sheriff's job to Dipper and rides off, Mary promising to meet him.

Cast 
James Craig as Tom Sabin
Martha Vickers as Mary Hoag
Edgar Buchanan as Dipper
Brett Halsey as Johnny Naco
Paul Richards as Hoag
Richard Martin as Quijano
Blu Wright as Farmer Brown
John Swift as Zodie Dawes
Paul Raymond as Bartender

References

External links 
 

1960 films
1960s English-language films
American Western (genre) films
1960 Western (genre) films
Universal Pictures films
American black-and-white films
1960s American films